Sándor Pécsi (18 March 1922 – 4 November 1972) was a Hungarian actor born in Sajószentpéter, Hungary. He appeared in more than 60 films between 1948 and 1972 before dying on 4 November 1972 in Budapest, Hungary.

Selected filmography

 Talpalatnyi föld (1948)
 Mickey Magnate (1949) - Biró
 Egy asszony elindul (1949) - Szekeres
 Szabóné (1949) - Hódis
 Úri muri (1950) - Pincér
 Kis Katalin házassága (1950) - Barna
 Különös házasság (1951) - Medve Ignác, doktor
 Felszabadult föld (1951) - Jámbor Lajos
 Nyugati övezet (1952) - Forgács
 Erkel (1952) - Erkel Ferenc
 Young Hearts (1953) - Dani Sándor
 The Sea Has Risen (1953) - Nyári Pál
 Under the City (1953) - Varga
 Simon Menyhért születése (1954) - Bonta
 Rokonok (1954) - Kardics
 Liliomfi (1955) - Szellemfi
 Dandin György, avagy a megcsúfolt férj (1955) - Dandin György
 Bakaruhában (1957) - Bodrogi
 St. Peter's Umbrella (1958) - Bélyi János, plébános
 Yesterday (1959) - Fekete õrnagy
 A harangok Rómába mentek (1959) - Angel úr
 Kard és kocka (1959) - Varga Máté kocsmáros
 Szerelem csütörtök (1959) - Máró
 Rangon alul (1960) - Egy másik papa, aki szintén szeretné
 Az arc nélküli város (1960) - Vedres Pál százados
 A Noszty fiú esete Tóth Marival (1960) - Pázmár dr.
 Az ígéret földje (1961) - Bakonyi
 Megszállottak (1962) - Kútfúró mester
 Egyiptomi történet (1963) - Hajóskapitány
 Félúton (1963) - Limpár Kálmán
 Tücsök (1963) - Virág
 Hogy állunk, fiatalember? (1963) - Fáraó, tanár
 Germinal (1963) - Maheu
 Párbeszéd (1963) - Safrankó Mihály
 Új Gilgames (1964) - Aradi doktor
 A pénzcsináló (1964) - Bányai Péter
 Özvegy menyasszonyok (1964) - Kovács Péter rendörörnagy
 The Golden Head (1964) - Priest
 Kár a benzinért (1965) - Balogh Imre
 Nem (1965) - Író
 Tilos a szerelem (1965) - Dani
 Az orvos halála (1966) - Tanácstitkár
 Aranysárkány (1966) - Liszner - zöldséges
 Sellö a pecsétgyürün I (1967) - Salgó Oszkár
 Sellö a pecsétgyürün II (1967) - Salgó Oszkár
 Baleset (1967) - Traps
 Kártyavár (1968) - Hajóskapitány
 A hamis Izabella (1968) - Lovass Dezsõ
 The Boys of Paul Street (1968) - Rácz tanár úr
 Hazai pálya (1969) - Virág, tanácselnök
 Az örökös (1969) - Párttitkár
 Utazás a koponyám körül (1970) - Tibor, fõpincér
 Szerelmi álmok – Liszt (1970) - Belloni
 Hahó, Öcsi! (1971) - Határõr
 Fuss, hogy utolérjenek! (1972) - Tokaji Gáspár, számlaellenõr
 Harminckét nevem volt (1972) - Forrai

References

External links 
 

1922 births
1972 deaths
Hungarian male film actors
People from Sajószentpéter
20th-century Hungarian male actors